Cyana alborosea is a moth of the family Erebidae. It was described by Francis Walker in 1865. It is found in China (Hong Kong), India (Sikkim, Assam), Bhutan, Myanmar and on Java.

References

Cyana
Moths described in 1865